Zeritis krystyna is a butterfly in the family Lycaenidae. It is found in central Angola.

References

Endemic fauna of Angola
Butterflies described in 1980
Aphnaeinae